Mirabad (also Romanized as Mīrābād; also known as Mir Abad Bampoor) is a village in Bampur-e Gharbi Rural District, Central District, Bampur County, Sistan and Baluchestan Province, Iran. At the 2006 census, its population was 1,432, in 264 families.

References 

Populated places in Bampur County